The North American land mammal ages (NALMA) establishes a geologic timescale for North American fauna beginning during the Late Cretaceous and continuing through to the present. These periods are referred to as ages or intervals (or stages when referring to the rock strata of that age) and were established using geographic place names where fossil materials were obtained.

System
The North American land-mammal-age system was formalized in 1941 as a series of provincial land-mammal ages. The system was the standard for correlations in the terrestrial Cenozoic record of North America and was the source for similar time scales dealing with other continents. The system was revised into a formal chronostratigraphic system. This approach is nominally justified by international stratigraphic codes; it holds that first appearances of individual species in particular sections are the only valid basis for naming and defining the land-mammal ages.

The basic unit of measure is the first/last boundary statement. This shows that the first appearance event of one taxon is known to predate the last appearance event of another. If two taxa are found in the same fossil quarry or at the same stratigraphic horizon, then their age-range zones overlap.

The utility of the system led to its expansion into the Cretaceous (formalized 1986) and the Holocene (formalized 2014). These additions have been used in research related to the Cretaceous–Paleogene extinction event and the ensuing recovery, and to the Anthropocene debate, respectively.

Ages

Cenozoic land mammal ages
Saintaugustinean: Lower boundary 0.004 Ma. Upper boundary Present.
Santarosean: Lower boundary 0.012 Ma. Upper boundary 0.004 Ma.
Rancholabrean: Lower boundary 0.3 Ma. Upper boundary 0.012 Ma.
Irvingtonian: Lower boundary 1.8 Ma. Upper boundary 0.3 Ma.
Blancan: Lower boundary 4.9 Ma. Upper boundary 1.8 Ma.
Hemphillian: Lower boundary 10.3 Ma. Upper boundary 4.9 Ma.
Clarendonian: Lower boundary 13.6 Ma. Upper boundary 10.3 Ma.
Barstovian: Lower boundary 15.97 Ma. Upper boundary 13.6 Ma.
Hemingfordian: Lower boundary 20.43 Ma. Upper boundary 15.97 Ma.
Arikareean: Lower boundary 30.8 Ma. Upper boundary 20.43 Ma.
Harrisonian: Lower boundary 24.8 Ma. Upper boundary 20.43 Ma.  
Monroecreekian: Lower boundary 26.3 Ma. Upper boundary 24.8 Ma.
Geringian: Lower boundary 30.8 Ma. Upper boundary 26.3 Ma.
Whitneyan: Lower boundary 33.3 Ma. Upper boundary 30.8 Ma.
Orellan: Lower boundary 33.9 Ma. Upper boundary 33.3 Ma.
Chadronian: Lower boundary 37.2 Ma. Upper boundary 33.9 Ma.
Duchesnean: Lower boundary 40.4 Ma. Upper boundary 37.2 Ma.  
Uintan: Lower boundary 46.2 Ma. Upper boundary 40.4 Ma.  
Bridgerian: Lower boundary 50.3 Ma. Upper boundary 46.2 Ma.
Wasatchian: Lower boundary 55.8 Ma. Upper boundary 50.3 Ma.
Clarkforkian: Lower boundary 56.8 Ma. Upper boundary 55.8 Ma.
Tiffanian: Lower boundary 61.7 Ma. Upper boundary 56.8 Ma.
Torrejonian: Lower boundary 63.3 Ma. Upper boundary 61.7 Ma.
Puercan: Lower boundary 66.043 Ma. Upper boundary 63.3 Ma.

Cretaceous land mammal ages
Lancian: Lower boundary 70 Ma. Upper boundary 66 Ma.
Judithian: Lower boundary 84 Ma. Upper boundary 70 Ma.
Aquilian: Lower boundary  86 Ma. Upper boundary 84 Ma.

Other continental ages

European land mammal age
South American land mammal age
Asian land mammal age

See also
Appearance Event Ordination
Biochronology

References

 
 
 
Regional geologic time scales
Cenozoic North America
Mesozoic North America